The Clarence Football Club, nicknamed The Kangaroos (and usually referred to as simply "The Roos"), is an Australian rules football club playing in the Tasmanian State League, based in Bellerive, Tasmania.

Before 1947, they existed as Bellerive Football Club.

The Club play their home games at Blundstone Arena (formerly Bellerive Oval), Hobart's Test Cricket ground, they share the facilities with Tasmania's cricket team, the Tasmanian Tigers.

History
Clarence joined the Tasmanian Football League in 1947 on a two-year probationary period from the Southern District Football Association, later being granted permanent status on 7 August 1950, and continued to participate in the league until it was disbanded in December 2000.

They then joined the Southern Football League and participated until the end of the 2008 season whereby the club opted to join the newly reformed Tasmanian State League from 2009 and have won the first two premiership titles on offer since joining the competition and only in the 2015 season missed out on the finals.

Club details
Home ground – Blundstone Arena (formerly Bellerive Oval)
Established – 1884 (as Bellerive Football Club)
Playing colours – Red and white (Maroon and white until 1979)
Emblem – Kangaroos
Club theme song – "Clarence are the team to beat, I sing to you!" (Tune: "The Battle Hymn of the Republic")
Affiliations – Various junior competitions including the SDFA (1884–1946) TANFL/TFL/TSL (1947–2000, 2009–present), SFL (2001–2008)

Honours

Club
 Tasmanian Football League
 Premiers (11): 1970, 1979, 1981, 1984, 1993, 1994, 1996, 1997, 2000, 2009, 2010
 Runners-up (6): 1962, 1969, 1971, 1985, 1995, 1998
 Southern Football League (4)
 Premiers (4): 2001, 2002, 2004, 2006
 Runners-up (2): 2005, 2007

Individual
William Leitch Medallists (Best and fairest player – TFL senior football)
 1949 – Hamish Yaxley
 1960 – Stuart Spencer
 1967 – J.Richmond and Stuart Spencer
 1968 – Bob Lucas
 1976 – Trevor Sorrell
 1989 – Scott Wade
 1991 – Gary Williamson
 1995 – Danny Noonan
 1996 – Danny Noonan
 1999 – Matthew Jones

Tassie Medallists (Best and fairest player – TSL senior football from 2009)
 2010 - Brett Geappen

George Watt Medallists (Best and fairest player – TFL reserves football)
 1957 – B. Burn (tied)
 1974 – P. Smith

V. A. Geard Medallists (Best and fairest player – TFL thirds football)
 1957 – Russell Newell
 1965 – Royce Hart
 1973 – P. Smith
 1979 – M. Kruene

D. R. Plaister Medallists (Best and fairest player – TFL fourths football)
 1978 – T. Carter
 1984 – Brendan Mayne
 1990 – Steven Old

Dolphin Medallists (Best and fairest player – NFL Shield)
 1989 – Scott Wade

Lefroy Medallists (Best and fairest player – Tasmanian team)
 1956 – J.Golding
 1957 – S. Spencer (tied)
 1960 – S. Spencer
 1981 – Rod Hughes (Tied)
 1988 – Billy Picken
 1989 – Scott Wade
 2012 - Brady Jones
 2016 - Jake Cox

All-Australian team members
 1958 – S. Spencer

Club record score:
 TFL: 38.16 (244) vs Devonport 4.4 (28) on 14 August 1999 at Bellerive Oval
 SFL: 41.23 (269) vs Brighton 5.4 (34) on 7 May 2005 at Bellerive Oval

Club games record holder:
 315 – Scott McCallum from 1989 to 2007
 314 – Gavin Cooney from 1989 to 2006 and 2009

Attendance records
Record home attendance: Bellerive Oval
 5,157 – Clarence v New Norfolk on 6 June 1970 at Bellerive Oval

Record roster match attendance: all time
 8,480 – Clarence v Glenorchy on 4 April 2011 at KGV Oval

Record TANFL/TFL finals attendance:
 24,968 – Clarence v Glenorchy on 22 September 1979 for the TANFL Grand Final at North Hobart Oval

Record SFL Premier League finals attendance:
 7,149 – Clarence v Glenorchy – 2006 SFL Premier League Grand Final at North Hobart Oval.

Current Playing List

Current playing list

Notable players 
There is a list of past and present Clarence players who have played at AFL/VFL:

Colin Alexander (Collingwood and Brisbane Bears)
Daniel Archer (St Kilda)
Jack Bennett (1920–1997) (Carlton)
Arthur Budd (1945–2012) (South Melbourne)
Ian Callinan (Adelaide)
Terry Cashion (1921–2011) (South Melbourne)
John Chivers (Richmond)
David Donato (Fitzroy)
Robert Dutton (Carlton and Hawthorn)
Bert Edwards (1914–1995) (Richmond)
Josh Green (Brisbane Lions and Essendon)
Graeme Hatcher (Essendon)
Paul Holdsworth (Sydney Swans)
Graham Hunnibell (Melbourne)
Noel Leary (Melbourne)
Royce Hart (Richmond)

Bob Lynch (Fitzroy)
Rod MacPherson (Footscray and Brisbane Bears)
Stephen MacPherson (Footscray)
Terry Mayne (1950-1983) (Geelong)
Danny Noonan (Brisbane Bears)
Eric Pascoe (Carlton)
Bradley Plain (Essendon, Collingwood and North Melbourne)
John Richmond (Richmond)
Justin Sherman (Brisbane Lions and Western Bulldogs)
Stuart Spencer (1932–2011) (Melbourne)
Scott Sutcliffe (Melbourne and Richmond)
Cameron Thurley (Geelong and Kangaroos)
Scott Wade (Hawthorn)
Jeromey Webberley (Richmond)
Michael Young (Carlton and Melbourne)
Jack Riewoldt (Richmond)

External links

Official website

Australian rules football clubs in Tasmania
Australian rules football clubs established in 1884
1884 establishments in Australia
Tasmanian Football League clubs
Sport in Hobart
City of Clarence